Barclay Preston Schoyer (June 13, 1911 – March 13, 1978) was active in American groups dealing with China, including the Yale-China Association, and the author of four novels and many articles on China.

Career
Schoyer studied at Yale College, where he wrote and illustrated for campus humor magazine The Yale Record. The Residential College he was affiliated with was Pierson.  After graduation in 1933, Schoyer taught English in Changsha, Hunan, for what was then the Yale-in-China Association, and returned to Yale to study Oriental literature and Chinese language. His return to China was cut short by the impending war. In 1940, he made a dramatic escape from Changsha. After the city had been bombed eight times, he led a group of twenty doctors, nurses, and wounded by junk to escape on the Xiang River after dark, only to be discovered and attacked on the river in the morning by a Japanese fighter plane. He managed to get the party out through Indo-China in six weeks. When the United States entered the war, he became a major in Air Intelligence, and created the Air Ground Aid Section (AGAS), which instructed airmen in how to evade or escape if downed behind enemy lines. He worked with Chinese guerrillas on several rescue operations. At the end of the war, he headed a mission to Shanghai to liberate seven thousand Allied prisoners being held in Japanese camps. For this work, Schoyer won the Legion of Merit and Soldier's Medal."

In the summer of 1941, Schoyer dated author Margaret Wise Brown.

As representative of Yale-in-China in Hong Kong in the early 1950s, he conducted negotiations between New Asia College and the government of the colony in establishing the college as an officially recognized school. From 1959 till July 1964, he was the Comptroller and Yale-in-China representative for New Asia. He was also the president of the Universities Service Centre in Hong Kong and special assistant to the vice-chancellor of the University. 
Schoyer was on the first delegation to the People's Republic organized by the National Committee on U. S.- China Relations in December 1972, participating in Nixon's Ping Pong Diplomacy effort. In 1978, several years after having returned to Yale-in-China as executive director, he became seriously ill and in March died of lung cancer.

Literary works
Schoyer wrote four novels with Chinese backgrounds:  The Foreigners (1942), The Indefinite River (1947), The Ringing of the Glass (1950), and The Typhoon's Eye (1959).

The Foreigners concerns a group of white expatriates living in a city very much like Changsha. Schoyer told Edward Gulick, who had taught in Changsha with him, that the hero of The Foreigners, Peter Achilles, was a combination of himself and Gulick (an earlier Yale-in-China Bachelor, who served from 1913–1914, was named Paul Achilles). Achilles tells a friend:  "I came out here for a year, just to see the world before I settled down; but I've stayed two and now I'm staying for another. And after that, perhaps I'll stay forever. China's fatal, isn't it? It's like a drug." "More than that," his friend replies, "It changes people. It hurts some and makes other magnificent." 

In addition to his novels, Schoyer worked as a correspondent for the Worldwide Press Service and a regular contributor to The Saturday Review, The New Yorker, The Reporter, and The New York Times Magazine.

References

Sources
 
 Flint, Peter B.  "B. Preston Schoyer, 66, Novelist, And Author of Articles on China."  New York Times, March 14, 1978.
 Marcus, Leonard S., Margaret Wise Brown: Awakened by the Moon, Beacon Press (Feb. 1992). 

1911 births
1978 deaths
20th-century American novelists
American male novelists
American sinologists
Yale College alumni
United States Army Air Forces personnel of World War II
Recipients of the Legion of Merit
Recipients of the Soldier's Medal
People from Riverside, Connecticut
American male non-fiction writers
United States Army Air Forces officers
20th-century American male writers